Higganum Reservoir State Park is a public recreation area occupying  on the banks of Higganum Reservoir in the town of Haddam, Connecticut. The state park offers fishing, hiking, hunting, and a launch area for car-top boating. It entered the state rolls as a 75-acre state park in the 1955 edition of the Connecticut Register and Manual.

References

External links
Higganum Reservoir State Park Connecticut Department of Energy and Environmental Protection

State parks of Connecticut
Parks in Middlesex County, Connecticut
Haddam, Connecticut
Protected areas established in 1955
1955 establishments in Connecticut